Cochylis roseana is a moth of the family Tortricidae. It is found in most of Europe (except Ireland, Fennoscandia, the Baltic region, Portugal and Greece), Uralsk, Iran, Asia Minor and China (Gansu).

The forewing costa is nearly straight ; light yellow-ochreous, towards costa and posteriorly suffused with rose-pink and with a ferruginous-ochreous median fascia, becoming obsolete towards costa, dorsally sprinkled with dark fuscous; cilia yellow-ochreous, with a dark fuscous subapical line. Hindwings light gre

The larvae feed on Dipsacus sylvestris, Chrysocoma and Solidago. They live in a silk tunnel bored through the sides of several seeds of the host plant. Larvae can be found from August to May. .The larva is pale green with the head and plate of 2 black.

References

External links
Lepiforum.de

roseana
Moths described in 1796
Moths of Europe
Moths of Asia
Taxa named by Adrian Hardy Haworth